Engelbert König (8 October 1919 – 23 November 1997) was an Austrian footballer. König was a technical and determined striker during his career.

His main debut was while he was on the Fiorentina team, the biggest series, and continued to gain traction in his career from then on.

During the war 
König stayed in Rome til the end of World War 2 and took part in the city tournament organized to keep interest in sport after the war.

References
 stats on rsssf.com
 enciclopediadelcalcio.it

1919 births
1997 deaths
Austrian footballers
Austrian expatriate footballers
Association football forwards
Footballers from Vienna
Serie A players
Serie B players
First Vienna FC players
ACF Fiorentina players
Catania S.S.D. players
S.S. Lazio players
U.C. Sampdoria players
Genoa C.F.C. players
A.C.R. Messina players
Expatriate footballers in Italy